Brian Hocking (22 September 1914 – 23 May 1974) was a Canadian entomologist known for his work in medical entomology on blood-sucking flies, particularly black-flies and mosquitoes. He was also a specialist on insect host detection and flight. He was also the author of several popular books dealing with biology and entomology.

Biography 
Hocking was born in London, and after a B.Sc. from the Imperial College, he worked for some time as an entomologist in the British Indian Army posted in Lucknow during World War II. He joined the University of Alberta in 1946, completing his masters and a Ph.D. (1953) from the Imperial College with a thesis on The intrinsic range and speed of the flight of insects before becoming a faculty member, a position he kept for the rest of his life. He was a keen educator, and made numerous TV and radio programs, apart from helping develop the curriculum of Edmonton schools. He received a Gold Medal of the Entomological Society of Canada in 1973. In a review he wrote that most of the literature on mosquitoes were on Aedes and Culex and that these were unrepresentative of the mosquitoes. He also worked on flight and its efficiency in insects. Hocking also made studies on insects and their associations with the African thorn acacias. He founded a newsletter called Quaestiones Entomologicae. He worked on entomology even during his last days as a cancer patient.

References

External links 
 A plea for better science teaching in our schools - talk by Brian Hocking at Toronto University. p.53-54. Varsity Graduate. Christmans 1960 (with photo)

Academic staff of the University of Alberta
Alumni of Imperial College London
1914 births
1974 deaths
Canadian entomologists
20th-century Canadian zoologists
British emigrants to Canada